Hornemann or Horneman may refer to:
 C. F. E. Horneman (Christian Frederik Emil, 1840–1906), Danish composer, grandson of Christian Horneman
 Christian Horneman (1765–1844), Danish painter
 Christian Hersleb Horneman (1781–1860), Norwegian jurist
 Ebbe Carsten Hornemann (1784–1851), Norwegian politician
 Emil Horneman (1809–1870), (=Johan Ole Emil Horneman), Danish composer, son of Christian Horneman
 Friedrich Hornemann (1772–1801), German explorer in Africa
 Jens Wilken Hornemann (1770–1841), Danish botanist